Dichagyris erubescens is a moth of the family Noctuidae. It is found in Turkey and adjacent areas, more specifically the Transcaucasia, Iraq, western
Iran, Israel, Syria, Jordan and the Sinai in Egypt.

Adults are on wing from May to July. There is one generation per year.

External links
 Noctuinae of Israel

erubescens
Moths of Asia
Moths of Africa
Moths described in 1892